The 2014–15 Saint Mary's Gaels women's basketball team will represent Saint Mary's College of California in the 2014–15 college basketball season. It was head coach Paul Thomas's ninth season at Saint Mary's. The Gaels, members of the West Coast Conference, play their home games at the McKeon Pavilion. They finished the season 23–11, 13–5 in WCC play to finish in a tie for third place. They lost in the quarterfinals of the WCC women's basketball tournament to BYU. They were invited to the Women's National Invitation Tournament where they defeated Hawaii in the first round, Fresno State in the second round and Sacramento State in the third round before losing to UCLA in the quarterfinals.

Roster

Schedule and results

|-
!colspan=9 style="background:#06315B; color:#D80024;"| Regular Season

|-
|-
!colspan=9 style="background:#06315B; color:#D80024;"| WCC Women's Tournament

|-
!colspan=9 style="background:#06315B; color:#D80024;"| WNIT

Rankings

See also
Saint Mary's Gaels women's basketball
2014–15 Saint Mary's Gaels men's basketball team

References

Saint Mary's Gaels women's basketball seasons
Saint Mary's
Saint Mary's Gaels women's basketball
Saint Mary's Gaels women's basketball